Dioxys is a genus of cuckoo bees belonging to the family Megachilidae.

The species of this genus are found in Europe and North America.

Species
Dioxys ardens 
Dioxys atlanticus 
Dioxys aurifuscus 
Dioxys chalicoda 
Dioxys cinctus 
Dioxys distinguendus 
Dioxys heinrichi 
Dioxys lanzarotensis 
Dioxys modestus 
Dioxys moestus 
Dioxys montanus 
Dioxys pacificus 
Dioxys pomonae 
Dioxys productus 
Dioxys pumilus 
Dioxys rohweri 
Dioxys rufipes 
Dioxys turkestanicus

References

Megachilidae